Rem Offshore is a fishing and supply shipping company based in Fosnavåg, Norway. The group operates two platform supply vessels, one anchor handling tug supply vessels and two multi purpose supply vessels. In addition the group has two fishing vessels.

The company was founded by Aage Remøy, who is currently also chief executive officer, in 1996 as a spinoff from the family fisheries business. The group consists of two holding companies, Rem Offshore AS and Remøy Fiskeriselskap AS, responsible for the supply and fisheries fleet, respectively. Since the listing of REM Offshore on the Oslo Stock Exchange in 2007, Solstad Offshore ASA from Skudeneshavn has been the major shareholder of the company.

References

Shipping companies of Norway
Supply shipping companies
Companies based in Møre og Romsdal
Transport companies established in 1996
Seafood companies of Norway
Companies listed on Oslo Axess
Norwegian companies established in 1996
Fishing companies